Rittersdorf may refer to the following places in Germany:

 Rittersdorf, Rhineland-Palatinate
 Rittersdorf, Thuringia